Rule Independent School District is a public school district based in Rule, Texas (USA).  Located in western Haskell County, a small portion of the district extends into Stonewall County.

Rule ISD has one school Rule School that serves students in grades pre-kindergarten through twelve.

The Superintendent is Kent Lefevre. The principal is Paul Harris.

In 2009, the school district was rated "academically acceptable" by the Texas Education Agency.

State Championships

UIL Athletics

UIL Academics 
1994—Class A State Champion Team

1995—Class A State Champion Team

UIL One Act Play
1995—sf "Steel Magnolias", directed by Bobby Robinson

See also

List of school districts in Texas

References

External links
Rule ISD

School districts in Haskell County, Texas
School districts in Stonewall County, Texas